George Evan Roberts (August 19, 1857June 6, 1948) was Director of the United States Mint from 1898 to 1907, and again from 1910 to 1914.

Biography

George E. Roberts was born in Colesburg, Iowa, on August 19, 1857, the son of David and Mary (Harvey) Roberts.  He was raised in Dubuque County, Iowa, Manchester, Iowa, and Fort Dodge, Iowa.

At age, Roberts began a career in the newspaper industry by working as a printer's apprentice at the Fort Dodge Times, and later the Fort Dodge Messenger.  He was briefly city editor of the Sioux City Journal.  In 1878, he purchased the Fort Dodge Messenger and served as its editor.  Roberts was active in the Republican Party of Iowa and, in 1883, was elected State Printer of Iowa, holding this office until 1889.  In 1902, he and a partner purchased the Iowa State Register and the Des Moines Leader, which they merged to form the Des Moines Register and Leader.

As a newspaper editor, Roberts was particularly interested in economic and monetary policy.  He was an opponent of free silver.  In 1894, he published a response to William Hope Harvey's Coin's Financial School (1893), entitled Coin at School in Finance.  He followed this up with Money, Wages and Prices (1895) and Iowa and the Silver Question (1896).  Both of these works were important parts of the campaign that defeated William Jennings Bryan in the 1896 U.S. presidential election.  In 1902, Roberts authored the Iowa Republican Party's platform on tariffs, which criticized protectionism and supported reciprocity.

In 1898, United States Secretary of the Treasury Lyman J. Gage recommended that President of the United States William McKinley appoint Roberts Director of the United States Mint, and Roberts held that office from February 1898 to July 1907.  He then became president of the Commercial National Bank in Chicago.  In 1910, President William Howard Taft appointed Roberts to a third term as Director of the U.S. Mint, with Roberts holding office from July 1910 to November 1914.

Upon leaving government service in 1914, Roberts became assistant to the president of the National City Bank in New York City. In 1916 he was elected as a Fellow of the American Statistical Association.  He became a vice president of the bank in 1919, a position he held until 1931, when he became one of the bank's economic advisers, a position he held until his death.  From 1914 to 1940, Roberts edited the bank's Monthly Economic Letter, an investment bulletin dealing with world events, economic affairs, and national and international finances.  In 1929, he headed a delegation of financiers to Panama to study that country's finances.  He was a member of the Gold Delegation of the Financial Committee of the League of Nations from 1930 to 1932.

Roberts died at his home in Larchmont, New York, on June 6, 1948.

References

External links

1857 births
1948 deaths
Directors of the United States Mint
Fellows of the American Statistical Association
Members of the United States Assay Commission
People from Fort Dodge, Iowa
People from Dubuque County, Iowa
People from Manchester, Iowa
People from Larchmont, New York
People from Delaware County, Iowa
Mathematicians from New York (state)
McKinley administration personnel
Taft administration personnel
Woodrow Wilson administration personnel